TDO (Telefonsteckdose) is the telephone plug used by A1 Telekom Austria.

The sample here has 6 conductors (of a possible 10), 2 on one side (visible in picture) and 4 on the opposite side.
Connector dimensions are 3mm x 18mm (includes top latch).

See also 
 TAE connector

Telephone connectors